Umedpur Union is a union parishad of Shailkupa Upazila, in Jhenaidah District, Khulna Division of Bangladesh. There are 23 villages and 8 Mouzas in the union.

References

External links
 

Unions of Khulna Division
Unions of Shailkupa Upazila
Unions of Jhenaidah District